This article lists political parties in Bolivia.

Bolivia has a multi-party system, with numerous parties.

Current parties

Congressional parties 
The following parties and alliances are represented in the Plurinational Legislative Assembly:

National parties 
Nine groups are registered with the Supreme Electoral Tribunal as political organizations of national scope. Of these, only one, the Social Democratic Movement, is a civic group; the remaining eight are all political parties.

Subnational parties 
The following are some of the major parties registered with the Supreme Electoral Tribunal as subnational organizations within one of the nine Departments of Bolivia:

Groups contesting local elections 
Assembly of the Guarani People - North Charagua (Asamblea del Pueblo Guaraní – Charagua Norte, APG–CHARAGUA)
Change Charagua (Cambio Charagua, CACHA)
Huanuni for All (Huanuni para Todos, HUANUNI)
Regional Federation of Mining Cooperatives of Huanuni (Federación Regional de Cooperativas Mineras de Huanuni, FERCOMIN)
Socialist Aymara Group (Grupo Aymara Socialista, GAS)
Social Unity Uprising of September First (Levantamiento de Unidad Social Primero de Septiembre),
Unified Trade Union Sub Federation of Peasant Workers of Ancoraimes - Tupak Katari (Subfederación Sindical Única de Trabajadores Campesinos de Ancoraimes Tupak Katari, SFSUTCA-TK)
Yungas Cocalera Revolution (Revolución Cocalera Yungas, R-COCAY)

Dissolved parties

Parties that lost their registration in 2014 

 Movement Without Fear (Movimiento Sin Miedo, MSM)

Parties that lost their registration in 2013 

 Popular Consensus (Consenso Popular, CP; accredited as a citizen grouping)

Parties that lost their registration in 2009 

 Democratic and Social Power (Poder Democrático y Social, PDS)

Parties that lost their registration in 2006
 Free Bolivia Movement (Movimiento Bolivia Libre, MBL)
 Progress Plan (Plan Progreso, PP)
 Workers Social Union of Bolivia (Unión Social de Trabajadores de Bolivia, USTB)
 Indigenous Pachakuti Movement (Movimiento Indígena Pachakuti, MIP)
 Agrarian Patriotic Front of Bolivia (Frente Patriótico Agropecuario de Bolivia, FREPAB)
 Revolutionary Left Movement - New Majority (Movimiento Izquierda Revolucionaria – Nueva Mayoría, MIR-NM)
 New Republican Force (Nueva Fuerza Republicana, NFR)

Parties that lost their registration in 2005
 Patriotic Social Alliance (Alianza Social Patriótica, ASP)
 Institutional Vanguard Mariscal de Ayacucho (Vanguardia Institucional Mariscal de Ayacucho, VIMA)
 Bolivarian Movement (Movimiento Bolivariano, MOVIBOL)

Parties that lost their registration in 2002–2003
 Conscience of Fatherland - Patriotic Movement (Conciencia de Patria Movimiento Patriótico, CONDEPA-MP) 
 Bolivian Socialist Falange (Falange Socialista Boliviana, FSB) 
 Democratic National Katarism (Katarismo Nacional Democrático, KND) 
 Freedom and Justice Party (Partido Libertad y Justicia, PLJ)
 Citizens' Movement for Change (Movimiento Ciudadano para el Cambio, MCC)
 Revolutionary Liberation Movement Tupaq Katari (Movimiento Revolucionario Tupaq Katari de Liberación, MRTKL) 
 Communist Party of Bolivia (Partido Comunista de Bolivia, PCB)
 Young Force Party (Partido Fuerza Joven, PFJ) 
 Socialist Party (Partido Socialista, PS)
 Revolutionary Vanguard 9th April (Vanguardia Revolucionaria 9 de Abril, VR-9)

See also
 Lists of political parties
 Liberalism in Bolivia

References

Bolivia
 
Political parties
Political parties
Bolivia